Emma is an unincorporated community in White County, Illinois, United States. It has a post office with ZIP code 62834.

References

Unincorporated communities in White County, Illinois
Unincorporated communities in Illinois